The Juno Awards of 2016, honouring Canadian music achievements, were presented in Calgary the weekend of 2–3 April 2016. The ceremonies were held at the Scotiabank Saddledome and televised on CTV. It was the first televised awards show to be broadcast in 4K ultra high-definition.

Events
The primary ceremony hosts were musician Jann Arden and athlete and television personality Jon Montgomery. It included performances by Bryan Adams, Dean Brody, Alessia Cara, Dear Rouge, Coleman Hell, Scott Helman, Shawn Hook, Lights, Shawn Mendes, The Weeknd and Whitehorse. The television broadcast on CTV attracted ratings of 1.4 million viewers.

The Juno Cup charity hockey game was played at Max Bell Centre on 1 April.

Nominees and winners
Burton Cummings is the 2016 inductee into the Canadian Music Hall of Fame. His band, The Guess Who, was inducted in 1987. Rosalie Trombley, former music director for CKLW radio, will be presented with the year's Walt Grealis Special Achievement Award. Arcade Fire is the recipient of the Allan Waters Humanitarian Award for their contributions to various non-profit organizations.

Nominees were announced on 2 February 2016. The lack of female nominees in categories such as Artist of the Year and Album of the Year resulted in social media discussions tagged "#JunosSoMale". Musicians Amy Millan and Grimes were also critical of the gender balance of this year's nominations.

People

Albums

Songs and recordings

Other

References

2016 music awards
2016
Music festivals in Alberta
Culture of Calgary
2016 in Canadian music
April 2016 events in Canada
2016 in Alberta